Dysgonia constricta is a moth of the family Noctuidae first described by Arthur Gardiner Butler in 1874. It is found in New Guinea and the Australian states of New South Wales and Queensland.

The larvae feed on Elaeocarpus obovatus.

References

External links

Dysgonia